Erica Benner is a political philosopher who has held academic posts at St Antony's College, Oxford, the London School of Economics and Yale University. She was awarded a DPhil by Oxford in 1993. She is the author of the books Really Existing Nationalisms (Oxford University Press, 1995), Machiavelli's Ethics (Princeton University Press, 2009), Machiavelli's Prince: A New Reading (Oxford University Press, 2013) and Be Like the Fox: Machiavelli's Lifelong Quest for Freedom (Penguin Allen Lane, 2017). Be Like the Fox was described by Terry Eagleton as "lively, compulsively readable biography", chosen by Julian Baggini as one of his picks for The Guardian's best books of 2017 list, and shortlisted for the 2018 Elizabeth Longford Prize for Historical Biography.

References

External links

Academics of the London School of Economics
Alumni of the University of Oxford
Fellows of St Antony's College, Oxford
Political philosophers
Yale University fellows
Living people
Year of birth missing (living people)